Faouzia Farida Charfi (born 1941 in Sfax,  Rekik) is a Tunisian scientist, intellectual and politician. She was Minister of State for Education in 2011.

Life
She became the Tunisian Minister of State for Education in 2011.

Recognition
In 1997 she was appointed a Chevalier de la Légion d’Honneur, and in 2001 a Commandeur des Palmes Académiques. In 2019 she was awarded the Chair's medal of the Arab World Institute in recognition of her work against islamic fundamentalism.

Personal life
Charfi's husband was Mohamed Charfi (1936-2008), a Tunisian academic and politician.

Selected publications

External links 

 Première partie : la science dans les contextes islamiques Conversation between the Islamologist Ghaleb Bencheikh and Faouzia Charfi at France Culture on January 16, 2022.
 Deuxième partie : la science dans les contextes islamiques Conversation between the Islamologist Ghaleb Bencheikh and Faouzia Charfi at France Culture on January 23, 2022.

References

1941 births
Living people
Tunisian women physicists
Women government ministers of Tunisia
People from Sfax
Government ministers of Tunisia
Tunisian physicists
University of Paris alumni
Tunis El Manar University alumni
20th-century physicists
20th-century women scientists
21st-century physicists
21st-century women scientists
21st-century Tunisian women politicians
21st-century Tunisian politicians
Chevaliers of the Légion d'honneur
Commandeurs of the Ordre des Palmes Académiques
Tunisian expatriates in France
Tunisian feminists
Tunisian women activists
Tunis University alumni